Taiwan Provincial Stadium (now Taichung Municipal Stadium) is a multi-use stadium in North District, Taichung, Taiwan.  It is currently used mostly for football matches. The stadium is able to hold 30,000 people and was opened in 1950.

See also
 List of stadiums in Taiwan

External links
National Taiwan University of Physical Education and Sport Stadium - Ministry of Education 

Football venues in Taiwan
Athletics (track and field) venues in Taiwan
Buildings and structures in Taichung
Sport in Taichung
Multi-purpose stadiums in Taiwan